A. rex  may refer to:
 Amphecostephanus rex, a praying mantis species found in Angola and Malawi
 Anatalavis rex, a prehistoric bird species from the Late Cretaceous or Early Paleocene of New Jersey
 Aralia rex, a plant species related to spikenard

See also
 Rex (disambiguation)